Abdullah bin Abdulaziz Al Saud (1931 – 4 July 2015) was a Saudi royal who served as the governor of the Northern Borders Province from 1957 until his death in 2015. He also served as the governor of Qassim Province for ten years. He was one of the longest serving governors in the Kingdom.

Early life
Abdullah was born in Ha'il in 1931. His father, Prince Abdulaziz bin Musaid, was the cousin of King Abdulaziz and one of his commanders. His brother, Prince Jiluwi bin Abdulaziz, is the governor of Najran Region. Prince Abdullah was appointed by King Saud to the post as governor of the Northern Borders Region in 1956.

Death
Prince Abdullah bin Abdulaziz died on 4 July 2015. He was buried after Isha prayer on 6 July 2015 at the Grand Mosque in Makkah.

References

Abdullah
Abdullah
1931 births
2015 deaths
Governors of provinces of Saudi Arabia
People from Ha'il
Saudi Arabian princes